Cleona Ní Chrualaoí is an Irish film and television producer.

Career

Ní Chrualaoí was born in Reading, England, but moved at age four to County Meath in Ireland, the country of her parents. She graduated from Dublin City University with a bachelor's degree in journalism in 2001. She worked as a reporter and presenter in radio and television before beginning to produce documentaries and other films in the Irish language.

The Quiet Girl (Irish: An Cailín Ciúin), Ní Chrualaoí's first feature film, premiered at the 72nd Berlinale in 2022 and has received critical acclaim. It was nominated for Best International Feature Film at the 95th Academy Awards in the US.

Personal life
Bairéad is married to Colm Bairéad, who wrote and directed The Quiet Girl. They have two children.

Partial filmography

As producer

References

External links

Living people
Irish radio journalists
Irish television journalists
Irish women journalists
Irish women film producers
Irish women television producers